Turkey national amputee football team is the men's national team of Turkey in amputee football. It is governed by the Turkish Disabled Sports Federation (TBESF), and takes part in international amputee football competitions.

Achievements

Current squad

Coach:  Osman Çakmak

References

Amputee
Amputee football in Turkey
Parasports teams
Disability organizations based in Turkey